The Dutch Basketball League (DBL) All-Defense Team is a team constituted by the best defensive players in a season of the Dutch Basketball League, the highest professional basketball league in the Netherlands. This team is based on players' performance throughout the regular season. After the end of the season, the best players of each position are chosen.

List of All-Defense teams
Bold indicates the player who won the Defensive Player of the Year award in the same year (given from 2013 to 2021). Numbers in brackets denote how many time the player was named to the tea.

Selections by player

References

All-Defense Team